Łopata Polska  is a hamlet in the Żegiestów at the administrative district of Gmina Muszyna, within Nowy Sącz County, Lesser Poland Voivodeship, in southern Poland, close to the border with Slovakia.

References

Villages in Nowy Sącz County